Espen Hammer Berger (born 9 March 1994) is a Norwegian footballer who plays as a defender for 1. divisjon side Sandnes Ulf.

Career
He played for Levanger between 2012 and 2018, joining Start one game into the 2018 season. He then made his Eliteserien debut in April 2018 against Rosenborg. In 2020 he joined 1. divisjon side Sandnes Ulf.

Career statistics

Club

References

1994 births
Living people
People from Levanger
Norwegian footballers
Levanger FK players
IK Start players
Sandnes Ulf players
Eliteserien players
Norwegian First Division players
Association football defenders
Sportspeople from Trøndelag